From March 12 to June 7, 1924, voters of the Republican Party chose its nominee for president in the 1924 United States presidential election. Only 17 states held Republican primaries that year, with most states selecting Convention delegates through caucuses and state-level conventions.  Delegates chose through the primary process (in those states that held primary elections) attended the 1924 Republican National Convention held from June 10 to June 12, 1924, in Cleveland, Ohio.

See also
1924 Democratic Party presidential primaries

References